Plicadomus is a genus of air-breathing land snails, terrestrial pulmonate gastropod mollusks in the family Streptaxidae.

Distribution 
The genus Plicadomus is endemic to Mauritius.

Species
Species within the genus Plicadomus include:

References

Streptaxidae
Endemic fauna of Mauritius